St. Joseph's Abbey is a Trappist monastery in Spencer, Massachusetts. It is known as a center of prayer and monastic work. Jams and beer produced by the monks are particularly popular. The monastery is also known as one of the origins of the centering prayer movement in the 1970s. Certain parts of the abbey are generally open to the public.

History 
St. Joseph's Abbey was founded in 1950 on the former site of Alta Crest Farms, under the leadership of Dom Edmund Futterer. The monks moved there from their previous location in Cumberland, Rhode Island, which was heavily damaged by a 1950 fire.

Father Thomas Keating was elected abbot of the abbey in 1961. Keating, a leader in the contemplative prayer movement, retired in 1981.  Keating, William Meninger, and Basil Pennington held retreats at the abbey to teach this method of prayer.

Another notable monk of the abbey was Fr. Raphael Simon (1909-2006). Fr. Simon received his M.D. from the University of Michigan. He interned at Bellevue Hospital, and practiced as a psychiatrist in New York. Following his conversion, he became a monk of Saint Joseph's Abbey. He gave retreats to the monks of his Order in the United States and Ireland, and was a spiritual director for monks, priests and lay people. His book, "Hammer and Fire: Way to Contemplative Happiness and Mental Health" is available on Amazon.

After the short term of Dom Pascal Skutecky, Dom Augustine Roberts became the fourth Abbot in June 1984 and served two six-year terms. The next Abbot, Damian Carr, was elected in June 1996.

Dom Vincent Rogers was elected as the new abbot on 23 July 2020. Dom Vincent was born in Santa Monica, California. He is a graduate of the University of California where he majored in engineering, psychology and education. He entered the monastery in 1977; made his solemn profession in 1986 and was ordained a priest in 2010.

Goods produced

Trappist Preserves 
Trappist Preserves is a brand of fruit preserves produced and sold by the abbey. In 1954, shortly after their arrival in Spencer, a small, stove-top batch of mint jelly was made by Brother John Berchmans, one of the monks, with mint from their herb garden. Since monastic austerity at that time precluded the jelly from being served to the monks at meals, it was sold at the porters' lodge. The response to the jelly encouraged the monks to try making and selling other varieties. Soon, jelly-making proved to be a successful and compatible monastic industry, contributing about half of the income needed to run the abbey. The jams and jellies made by the monks are sold in supermarkets in the United States, particularly in the New England region. In 2005, the monks produced 1.7 million jars of preserves in 26 flavors, turning one and a half tons of fruit into preserves daily.

Spencer Brewery 
Spencer Brewery is the name of the brewery run by the abbey that produced Trappist beer from 2013 to 2022. In 2010, St. Joseph's Abbey explored the possibility of brewing beer like other Trappist monasteries, and sent several fact-finding missions — first to the Belgian Beer Fest in Boston, then to several Trappist breweries in Europe. The Trappist breweries made three recommendations for the new enterprise: hire a skilled brewing engineer; build a modern, state of the art facility; and only brew a single beer for the first five years. Over twenty test batches were developed before settling on the final beer's recipe. The first beer produced was a blonde ale at 6.5% alcohol by volume which was called Spencer Trappist Ale. , it was the first and only certified Trappist beer brewed in the United States.

The brewery occupied 36,000 square feet and had a capacity of 50 barrels. It held its first open house on August 6, 2016, to 2,500 visitors. Response from subsequent open houses was strong, and as of 2018 the brewery was exploring constructing a taproom that would be open year-round.

In May 2022, St. Joseph's Abbey ceased beer production and closed Spencer Brewery. In addition to the economic impact of the COVID-19 pandemic, the New England region had grown to have over 600 craft breweries (according to the Brewers Association), so it is believed that the abbey's brewery might have needed an advertising budget disproportionate to its production.

The Holy Rood Guild 
The monks at the abbey also make the highest quality liturgical vestments under the brand of The Holy Rood Guild.

References

Further reading

External links 
 Website for St. Joseph's Abbey
 Website for Spencer Trappist beers
 Website for Trappist Preserves

Trappist monasteries in the United States
Roman Catholic churches in Massachusetts
Churches in Worcester County, Massachusetts
Spencer, Massachusetts
Christian organizations established in 1950